Owo is a local government area in Ondo State, Nigeria.

Owo may also refer to:
 Owo, Enugu, a town in Enugu State, Nigeria
 OwO, an open-eye version of the UwU emoticon
 -owo, a common city name suffix in Poland

See also 
 Owo soup, in Nigerian cuisine
 Owo Museum, a museum in Owo, Ondo, Nigeria
 Ouo, a town in Burkina Faso
 OVO (disambiguation)